The following is a list of Fiji women's national rugby union team international matches.

Legend

Overall 
Fiji's overall international match record against all nations, updated to 16 October 2022, is as follows:

See Women's international rugby for information about the status of international games and match numbering

Full internationals

2000s

2010s

2020s

Other matches

References 

Fiji women's national rugby union team
Fiji
Rugby union in Fiji